Christine Lafuente (born 1968) is an American painter, born in Poughkeepsie, NY, and currently lives and works in Brooklyn, NY. She is best known for her still lives and landscapes, painted alla prima (in one sitting), in an energized, loose, wet-into-wet style. As a plein aire landscape painter, Lafuente's primary areas of focus are cityscapes and seascapes.

Education 
Lafuente holds an MFA from Brooklyn College, a CFA from the Pennsylvania Academy of the Fine Arts, and a BA from Bryn Mawr College. When at Brooklyn College, she studied painting with Lennart Anderson.

Work 
Lafuente's work is characterized by an interest in color and light, and by a blurriness of edges. It has been noted that the forms in her paintings "seem to merge and dissolve together". Lafuente has said of her work, "I have discovered the act of seeing to be itself an aesthetic or poetic act."

Exhibitions 
Lafuente has exhibited extensively in the US and abroad. She has had thirty five solo shows, at venues including the Somerville Manning Gallery in Delaware, Gross McCleaf Gallery in Philadelphia, Morpeth Contemporary Gallery in Hopewell, NJ, Frost and Reed Gallery in London, Cantor Fitzgerald Gallery at Haverford College, and Fleisher Art Memorial, Philadelphia. She has participated in many group shows, including at the American Academy of Arts and Letters, New York, NY,  the Woodmere Art Museum, Philadelphia, the Pennsylvania Academy of the Fine Arts, and the Delaware Art Museum.

Awards 
Lafuente has received numerous awards, notably a Philadelphia Sketch Club Medal for Achievement in Visual Arts, an Adolf and Esther Gottlieb Foundation Grant, and a Stobart Foundation Grant. She has received two Full Fellowships from the Vermont Studio Center, and was an Artist in Residence at the Fleisher Art Memorial from 1997 to 2002.

External links 

 Official website

References 

20th-century American painters
21st-century American painters
Living people
1968 births
Pennsylvania Academy of the Fine Arts alumni
21st-century American women artists
20th-century American women artists
American landscape painters
American still life painters
American women painters
Bryn Mawr College alumni
Brooklyn College alumni